The 1916 Kansas gubernatorial election was held on November 7, 1916. Incumbent Republican Arthur Capper defeated Democratic nominee W. C. Lansdon with 60.77% of the vote.

General election

Candidates
Major party candidates 
Arthur Capper, Republican
W. C. Lansdon, Democratic

Other candidates
E. N. Richardson, Socialist
Harry R. Ross, Prohibition

Results

References

1916
Kansas
Gubernatorial